Kristiyan Dimitrov (Bulgarian: Кристиян Димитров; born 16 April 1993) is a Bulgarian footballer who plays as a right back for Ustrem Donchevo.

Career

Ludogorets Razgrad
On 10 June 2016 he joined the Bulgarian champions Ludogorets Razgrad. On 28 May 2017 he completed his debut for the first team in the First League, scoring one of the goals for the 3:1 away win over Cherno More.

In July 2017, Dimitrov moved to Lokomotiv Gorna Oryahovitsa.  He left the club in April following a disagreement regarding bonus payments.

Career statistics

Club

References

External links
 

1993 births
Living people
Sportspeople from Varna, Bulgaria
Bulgarian footballers
First Professional Football League (Bulgaria) players
Second Professional Football League (Bulgaria) players
PFC Svetkavitsa players
FC Botev Vratsa players
PFC Dobrudzha Dobrich players
PFC Ludogorets Razgrad players
PFC Ludogorets Razgrad II players
FC Lokomotiv Gorna Oryahovitsa players
FC Tsarsko Selo Sofia players
Association football midfielders
Association football fullbacks